Delphin II (Dolphin) was the name given to a wolfpack of German U-boats that operated during the Battle of the Atlantic in World War II, from 26 December 1942 to 14 February 1943.

The group was responsible for sinking 10 merchant ships and 1 damaging one ship; 2 of the pack's U-boats were sunk.

Raiding history

U-boats involved

References

Wolfpacks of 1942
Wolfpacks of 1943